Rancho Grande is a municipality in the Matagalpa department of Nicaragua. As of 2005, its population was 26,223.

Municipalities of the Matagalpa Department